Mitte 2 
Is the third episode of a comedic series of novels by German writer Albrecht Behmel. The eponymous “Mitte” (“downtown”) is the first and most central borough of the German capital known for its lively art scene, clubs and bars.

Plot Introduction
Jenny Epstein has attracted a stalker, Fridjof, who is madly in love with her. She asks bumbling writer Albrecht for help. They swap their cell phones and thereby trigger a series of catastrophes and accidents during which Albrecht manages to attract a stalker for himself. He meets Mikki's step-mother, a wealthy jazz musician. She decides to help him finance a musical production but under the condition that Mikki marries and returns to his former job as a lawyer. What she doesn't know is that Mikki's current love-interest is her arch-rival, Margaud, another jazz-singer.

Autobiographical Issues
The author claimed that no real-life persons were depicted in the novel, including the protagonist and narrator, also called ‘’Albrecht’’ who has no surname in the series, even though obvious parallels exist. 
Like the protagonist, the author was a resident of Berlin Mitte (1995-2012). Most of the locations, galleries, malls, shops and bars however are made up.

Series and Production
The series includes four novels, all called “Mitte” plus a prequel titled “Homo Sapiens Berliner Art”, first published by Schenk, Passau, purchased an re-published by Satzweiss of Saarland in 2013. As a homage to the Hitchhiker’s Guide to the Galaxy, the Mitte-series of novels is labelled "a trilogy in five parts". Behmel started the series in 2006.

See also

 Berlin Marathon
 Stalking
 Musical
 Alcoholism
 Rite of passage
 Modal realism

External links
 Amazon Title Page
 Goodreads
 Review  Literatur Cafe
 Blake Snyder
 Lovelybooks

Bibliography
 Berlin - Mitte, Schmiedecke, R. (2004).
 Street Scenes: Brecht, Benjamin and Berlin, Whybrow, N. (2004).

References

2013 German novels
Novels set in Germany
Novels set in Berlin
Picaresque novels
Series of books
Fictional families
Roman à clef novels